Magnus Häggström (born November 4, 1986 in Örnsköldsvik, Sweden) is a Swedish former professional ice hockey player.

Häggström played in the Elitserien (SEL) with Modo Hockey during the 2009–10 and 2010–11 Elitserien seasons.

References

External links

1986 births
Living people
Modo Hockey players
Malmö Redhawks players
Rögle BK players
IF Sundsvall Hockey players
Swedish ice hockey forwards
People from Örnsköldsvik Municipality
Sportspeople from Västernorrland County
21st-century Swedish people